Qarah Kahriz (also Romanized as Qarah Kahrīz and Qareh Kahrīz) is a village in Churs Rural District, in the Central District of Chaypareh County, West Azerbaijan Province, Iran. At the 2006 census, its population was 175, in 43 families.

References 

Populated places in Chaypareh County